Guillermo Velasco Rodríguez (born 17 November 1976) was a Mexican politician affiliated with the Ecologist Green Party of Mexico. As of 2003 he served as Deputy of the LIX Legislature of the Mexican Congress as a plurinominal representative.

References

1976 births
Living people
Politicians from Guerrero
Universidad Iberoamericana alumni
Members of the Chamber of Deputies (Mexico)
Ecologist Green Party of Mexico politicians
Deputies of the LIX Legislature of Mexico